Nikolai Alexandrovich Shilov (10 July 1872 – 17 August 1930) was a Russian and Soviet chemist who studied reactions, catalysis, and induction. 

Shilov was born in Moscow and graduated in 1895 after which he worked in Leipzig in Wilhelm Ostwald's laboratory on chemical kinetics. In 1910 he became a professor of inorganic chemistry at the Moscow Technical College. During World War I he was involved with studies on gas warfare and developed along with N. D. Zelinsky charcoal adsorption masks for the protection of the Russian army. He studied oxidation reactions and introduced several terms including inductor, acceptor, and induction factor. In 1919 he examined the dissolution proportions of a substance in a mixture of two solvents. He gave an explanation for surface adsorption and the principle of ion-exchange filters.

References 

 

1872 births
1930 deaths
Russian chemists